A consumer unit is a type of distribution board (a component of an electrical power system within which an electrical power feed provides supply to subsidiary circuits).

UK 
The IET defines a consumer unit, also known as a consumer control unit or electricity control unit, as "a particular type of distribution board comprising a type-tested co-ordinated assembly for the control and distribution of electrical energy, principally in domestic premises, incorporating manual means of double-pole isolation on the incoming circuit(s) and an assembly of one or more fuses, circuit breakers, residual current operated devices or signalling and other devices proven during the type-test of the assembly as suitable for use."

Examples 

In the UK, there are four main types of Consumer Unit:
 Main Switch Consumer Unit - Offers highest degree of circuit separation as all circuits must be protected from earth leakage independently. This can also be an expensive solution as it necessarily uses RCBOs instead of MCBs. 
 Dual RCD Consumer Unit - Offers a cost-effective solution to meet 17th Edition Regulations by protecting two banks of circuits from earth leakage through the use of two RCDs. 
 High Integrity Consumer Unit - Usually used in larger properties with greater numbers of circuits, this type of consumer unit offers good circuit separation through the use of two or more RCDs whilst allowing for the independent use of RCBOs. Usually this type of consumer unit also allows for fully flexible configuration, meaning there is no restriction on the number of RCBOs used.  
 RCD Incomer Consumer Unit. Less common than the other types, an RCD incomer does not use a main switch. They are usually used as a sub-board to a main distribution panel.

Modern consumer units usually use DIN-rail mount breakers. The rail and the shape of the front opening are standardized but the busbar arrangements are not. Therefore, mixing of brands should generally be avoided and, where unavoidable, care should be taken to ensure that the breaker chosen is a good fit for the busbars.

The choice of consumer unit will reflect several factors such as the size and layout of the dwelling, number of floors, outbuildings, the expected load levels (ovens, showers, immersion heaters, electric blankets, car-chargers etc.), and how much protection is required for each circuit.

Generally a "split load" arrangement is used with some circuits protected by the RCD, and others not.

The box pictured top-right is a "Wylex standard" fitted with rewirable fuses. These boxes can also be fitted with cartridge fuses or miniature circuit breakers (MCBs). This type of consumer unit was very popular in Britain until 2001 when wiring regulations mandated residual current device (RCD) protection for sockets that could "reasonably be expected to" supply outdoor equipment (BS 7671:2001). There were a number of similar designs from other manufacturers but the Wylex ones are by far the most commonly encountered and the only ones for which fuseholders/breakers are still commonly available.

Some manufacturers have added innovative features such as CPN Cudis who have added a LED strip light to their 'Lumo' consumer unit to enhance visibility in dark locations such as under staircases.

RCD protection types 

Since the introduction of (BS 7671:2008 incorporating amendment no 1: 2011) 17th Edition IET Wiring Regulations, consumer units in the UK must provide RCD protection to all cables embedded in walls excepting high integrity circuits such as those for burglar alarms or smoke alarms.

Consumer units have different methods of protecting circuits. For example, a dual split-load consumer unit can be arranged in a two-story dwelling as follows:

RCD 1

Upstairs Lights,
Downstairs Ring Final,
Garage Sockets,
Cooker

RCD 2

Downstairs Lights,
Upstairs Sockets,
Shower,
Heating

By arranging the circuits like this, power will still be present on one of the floors if only one RCD trips out. Moreover, having sockets and lights on alternate RCD's means that if a faulty kettle downstairs trips that RCD for example, the kitchen lights will still be available, avoiding the hazard of investigating the fault in darkness.

Another way to protect circuits under the 17th Edition IET Wiring Regulations is by fitting Residual Current Circuit Breaker With Overload (RCBOs) to every circuit, and although this is more costly than the RCD+MCB's option, it means any fault condition on a circuit trips only that circuit's RCBO, so the search for the fault is narrowed down from the start. When an electrician must be called out, this localised fault can be resolved faster (and therefore cheaper) in contrast with the RCD+MCB's arrangement, which only indicates a fault somewhere within that RCD's set of circuits. 

Some older systems such as those that use MK or old MEM Consumer Units that had one fuse per spur, so for instance:

Upstairs Lights Fuse 1
Upstairs Sockets Fuse 2
Downstairs Lights Fuse 3
Downstairs Sockets Fuse 4
etc..

See also

 Other names for distribution boards

References

Electric power distribution
Electrical wiring

de:Verteiler (Elektroinstallation)